Land & Sea is the second studio album by Australian singer songwriter Ziggy Alberts. The album was released in December 2014. The album includes a number of re-recorded tracks from Feels Like Home and Made of Water alongside new tracks. Alberts said "This record was born in a caravan converted studio amongst the hills of Newrybar, New South Wales. The album drew comparisons to Jack Johnson and Xavier Rudd due to the breezy acoustic sound, chilled vocals and environmental messages.

In December 2019, the album was released on a 2x Deluxe vinyl alongside the EP Four Feet in the Forest.

Track listing

Release history

References

2014 albums
Ziggy Alberts albums